The Journal of the American Society of Hypertension was a monthly peer-reviewed medical journal covering hypertension. It was established in 2007 and was published until 2018 by Elsevier on behalf of the American Society of Hypertension, of which it was the official journal. The editor-in-chief was Daniel Levy (National Heart, Lung, and Blood Institute). According to the Journal Citation Reports, the journal had a 2017 impact factor of 2.615.

References

External links

Publications established in 2007
Elsevier academic journals
Monthly journals
Hypertension journals
Academic journals associated with learned and professional societies of the United States
English-language journals
Publications disestablished in 2018